The New Zealand Grand Prix, sometimes known as the New Zealand International Grand Prix, is an annual motor racing event held in New Zealand. First held in 1950, it is best known for hosting rounds of the Tasman Series in the 1960s and 1970s. It is currently run as the signature race of the Toyota Racing Series.

It is one of only two current national Grand Prix events that are not part of the Formula One World Championship, the other being the Macau Grand Prix.

History
The race was once an important race on the international calendar, most notably when it was a part of the Tasman Series. In this era, several contemporary Formula One drivers would compete in the race, often with great success. Six Formula One World Drivers' Champions have won the New Zealand Grand Prix, including three-time champions Sir Jack Brabham and Sir Jackie Stewart. In the years following the demise of the Tasman Series, Formula One drivers did not regularly compete in extra-curricular races, and as such the New Zealand Grand Prix lost many of its big-name entrants. It was run for smaller local or continental formulae in the 1990s and 2000s such as Formula Holden.

From 2006 to 2020, the race was run as part of the Toyota Racing Series, which has gained international prominence due to the championship being held over the Northern Hemisphere winter. This has resulted in many international drivers, particularly young developmental drivers, joining the championship in their traditional off-season, thus restoring a level of prestige to the event. It is seen as a stepping stone to larger open-wheeler classes, such as Formula 3, and beyond, and drivers such as Daniil Kvyat, Alex Lynn, Lance Stroll and Lando Norris have competed in the race and then gone on to compete as race or test drivers in Formula One.  From 2023, it will be part of the Formula Regional Oceania Championship.

In its history, the race has been held in eight different locations across New Zealand. Pukekohe Park Raceway in Pukekohe has been the most common venue, with the race being held there 29 times. The Circuit Chris Amon, formerly Manfeild Autocourse, in Feilding hosted the event between 2008 and 2020. Hampton Downs Motorsport Park, which had campaigned to host the event for several years, became the new host of the event in 2021. Due to travel restrictions caused by the COVID-19 pandemic, the 2021 event was only contested by New Zealand drivers, with Supercars Championship regulars Shane van Gisbergen and Andre Heimgartner joining the field alongside past winners Greg Murphy and Ken Smith, who contested his 50th New Zealand Grand Prix. Van Gisbergen won the event, despite starting from pitlane due to a pre-race issue.

Winners

Notes
  – The Manfeild Autocourse was renamed the Circuit Chris Amon in late 2016.

Multiple winners

By driver

By constructor

References

External links
 https://web.archive.org/web/20110303011741/http://www.motorsport.org.nz/the-new-zealand-grand-prix/

 
Auto races in New Zealand
National Grands Prix
Recurring sporting events established in 1950
1950 establishments in New Zealand
Tasman Series